The Blackburn Takeover was a student protest at Howard University in Washington, D.C. that started on October 12, 2021 and ended on November 15, 2021, to protest poor housing conditions. Leaders in this protest include Aniyah Vines, Deja Redding, Jasmine Joof, Lettirose Cargill, Cherelle Muhammad, Tyler Davis, and Elishabeth Cunningham. The #BlackburnTakeover went viral on social media platforms including Instagram and Twitter. The Live Movement, which is an HBCU coalition, helped in amplifying the protest. A primary complaint of the protesters include mold, mice, flooding and substandard living conditions in residential buildings on campus. Around 150 students have erected a tent city outside of the Blackburn University Center, demanding an improvement in living conditions and representation on the university's board of trustees. 

The students had 4 demands which are as follows: 

1. A town hall with President Frederick and the entire student body. 
2. Student trustee positions are to be permanently reinstated on to the Board of Trustees of Howard University.
3. A comprehensive housing plan to remedy all issues plaguing on campus and off campus housing. 
4. Academic, legal, and disciplinary immunity for all of the protestors involved.

Reaction 
The university claimed that as a result of the protest, Sodexho food service employees of the Blackburn café were laid off.

A number of prominent figures came out in support of the student protest.

 Senator Elizabeth Warren pledged her solidarity with students on Twitter
 Reverend Jesse Jackson visited the school to show his support.
 Rapper Gucci Mane and other performers on his record label pulled out of the university’s homecoming celebration to show support for the student’s demands. 
 Local lawmakers additionally showed their support, including At-Large Councilmember Anita Bonds and Ward 4 Councilmember Janeese Lewis George.

References 

Howard University
Student protests in Washington, D.C.